Rasammah Bhupalan (born 1 May 1927), also known as Rasammah Naomi Navarednam or Mrs F.R. Bhupalan, is a Malaysian freedom fighter and social activist.

She has championed causes such as the anti-drug abuse movement, women's rights, education and social justice causes.

Pre-Independence
Rasammah was one of the earliest women involved in the fight for Malaysian (then Malaya) independence. She joined the Rani of Jhansi Regiment, the women's wing of the Indian National Army, to fight the British. She served in Burma during World War II.

Women's Rights
As founder president of the Women Teacher's Union, she fought for equal pay for women teachers and tried to bring disparate teachers' unions under an umbrella.

The former school principal was the first Asian representative of the World Confederation of Organisations of the Teaching Profession for two successive terms. She was also very active in the National Council of Women's Organisation (NCWO) and Pemadam.

Recognition
Bhupalan was a teacher in the Methodist Boys School Kuala Lumpur (MBSSKL) from 1959 to 1964 and was the principal of Methodist Girls School Kuala Lumpur (MGSKL) for 14 years from 1969 until she retired in 1982. On 11 November 2007, Mrs. Bhupalan was among the few veteran teachers who were honored at MBSSKL's 110th Anniversary Celebration Dinner. The dinner was specially organized to honour all the former and current teachers of the school.

On 21 November 2006, a book entitled Footprints on The Sands of Time, Rasammah Bhupalan: A Life of Purpose authored by Associate Professor Dr Aruna Gopinath was launched by Culture, Arts and Tourism Minister Datuk Dr Rais Yatim.
 
The biography, published with the support of the National Archives, the ministry and NCWO, is about the life of Rasammah seen in a historical context.

See also
 Janaky Athi Nahappan
 Lakshmi Sahgal

References

 Ministry in search of remarkable Malaysians, The Star, 22 November 2006
 Mothers of substance, The Star, 20 August 2007.
 They dared to take up public office, The Star, 20 August 2007.

1927 births
Living people
Education activists
Indian National Army personnel
Indian revolutionaries
Malaysian activists

Malaysian people of Indian descent
Tamil activists
Tamil military personnel
Indian women's rights activists

Indian women of World War II